In enzymology, a glycine N-methyltransferase is an enzyme that catalyzes the chemical reaction

S-adenosyl-L-methionine + glycine  S-adenosyl-L-homocysteine + sarcosine

Thus, the substrates of this enzyme are S-adenosyl methionine and glycine, whereas its two products are S-adenosylhomocysteine and sarcosine.

Glycine N-methyltransferase belongs to the family of methyltransferase enzymes.  The systematic name of this enzyme class is S-adenosyl-L-methionine:glycine N-methyltransferase. Other names in common use include glycine methyltransferase, S-adenosyl-L-methionine:glycine methyltransferase, and GNMT.  This family of enzymes participates in the metabolism of multiple amino acids.

References

 
 
 
 
 
 

EC 2.1.1
Enzymes of known structure